Nur ol Din Mahalleh (also Romanized as Nūr ol Dīn Maḩalleh; also known as Nūr od Dīn Maḩalleh) is a village in Goli Jan Rural District, in the Central District of Tonekabon County, Mazandaran Province, Iran. As of the 2006 census, it had a population of 150 people, across 46 families.

References 

Populated places in Tonekabon County